This is a list of songs that reached No. 1 on the Billboard Japan Top Download Songs Chart in 2019.

Chart History

References 

Number-one digital singles of 2019
Japan Digital Singles